Over Norton Park is a farm of 210 acres (85 ha) at Over Norton, lying to the north of Chipping Norton, in the Cotswolds, Oxfordshire, England. It has been in the Dawkins family since the 1720s. Originally a larger country estate, it was inherited by John Dawkins (1915–2010), the father of the biologist Richard Dawkins, under whose management it became a single commercial farm which he farmed himself.

History
He was the uncle of Henry Dawkins the Younger (1728–1814), who inherited the property on his death. A Bodleian Library page comments on the build-up of Dawkins family holdings in the Chipping Norton area, including the purchase of Salford Manor by Henry Dawkins II.

William Gregory Dawkins replaced the Georgian mansion in 1874. By 1945, a much-reduced estate was in the hands of his great-nephew Hereward Dawkins.

The passing of Over Norton to another branch of the Dawkins family went back to the line of another son of Henry Dawkins III, Clinton George Augustus Dawkins (1808–1871). He was the great-grandfather of John Dawkins.

References

External links
 Over Norton Park Farm Shop website

Companies based in Oxfordshire
Parks and open spaces in Oxfordshire
Farms in Oxfordshire
Historic farms
Cotswolds
Richard Dawkins